The 37th Golden Raspberry Awards, or Razzies, was a parodic awards ceremony that honored the worst the film industry had to offer in 2016. The Golden Raspberry Awards, also known as the Razzies, are awarded based on votes from members of the Golden Raspberry Foundation. The pre-nomination ballots were revealed on the week of January 2, 2017, with the nominations being revealed on January 23, 2017. The winners were announced on February 25, 2017.

Hillary's America: The Secret History of the Democratic Party became the first documentary film to be awarded Worst Picture, also winning Worst Director, Worst Actor, and Worst Actress; Batman v Superman: Dawn of Justice also won four awards, including Worst Remake, Rip-off or Sequel and Worst Screenplay. Misconduct and Zoolander 2 won one award each, while Mel Gibson was awarded the Razzie Redeemer Award for directing Hacksaw Ridge.

Winners and nominees
Batman v Superman: Dawn of Justice and Zoolander 2 led the nominations with eight. Dirty Grandpa, Gods of Egypt, Hillary's America: The Secret History of the Democratic Party, and Independence Day: Resurgence were all nominated for five, making Hillary's America: The Secret History of the Democratic Party the most nominated documentary film in the awards' history. For the first time, each category now has six nominations.

Films with multiple nominations
The following thirteen films received multiple nominations:

Films with multiple wins
The following two films received multiple awards:

Box office performance of nominated films

See also
 89th Academy Awards
 70th British Academy Film Awards
 74th Golden Globe Awards
 23rd Screen Actors Guild Awards
 22nd Critics' Choice Awards

References

External links
 

37th
2016 film awards
2016 awards in the United States
February 2017 events in the United States
Events in Los Angeles
2017 in Los Angeles